HMS Trident was a British T class submarine built by Cammell Laird, Birkenhead. She was laid down on 12 January 1937 and was commissioned on 1 October 1939. HMS Trident was part of the first group of T class submarines.

Career

Trident operated in most of the naval theatres of the Second World War, in home waters in the North Sea and off the Scandinavian coast, in the Mediterranean and in the Pacific far east.

Home waters

In May 1940, Trident in Kors fjord Norway, destroyed a German supply ship with a torpedo, having forced it aground in an initial gun action.
She spent the period from 1941 to mid 1943 in the North Sea, where she sank the German merchants Edmund Hugo Stinnes 4, Ostpreußen, Donau II, Hödur and Bahia Laura, the German tanker Stedingen and the German auxiliary submarine chaser UJ 1213 / Rau IV.

Trident fired seven torpedoes against them, one of which hit Prinz Eugen in the stern and jammed her rudder and damaged her engines, but the Admiral Scheer escaped unscathed.

During much of this time the submarine had a young reindeer doe on board. It had been presented as an unexpected gift by the Russians in August 1941 as part of the diplomatic ceremonies to honour the alliance between Russia and Britain. The Reindeer was named Pollyanna after the base and apparently adapted so well to life on board (being fed table scraps and condensed milk) to the point that she ate a few navigations maps. When the submarine returned to the UK Pollyanna had grown to the extent that the services of the local slaughterman had to be used to truss her securely so she could be safely removed from the boat. Pollyanna then proceeded to live out the rest of her days in the local zoo, bobbing her head three times whenever she heard a whistle, as was her military training.

Mediterranean

In 1943, Trident was assigned to operate in the Mediterranean.  She sank five sailing vessels and damaged the Italian merchant Vesta and the German patrol vessel GA 41 / Tassia Christa, and attacked the German auxiliary submarine chaser UJ 2202.  She was unlucky on numerous occasions, however, her torpedoes missing two submarines, the Italian merchant Agnani and the French passenger/cargo ship Cap Corse.

She did not spend long in the Mediterranean before being reassigned to the Pacific far east, arriving there in mid 1943.

Far East

She spent the last part of her wartime career in operations against the Japanese, sinking a Japanese sailing vessel and landing craft  and unsuccessfully attacking the Japanese training cruiser .
The landing craft was attacked and sunk by her  deck gun on 19 June 1945 off the Batu islands, Indonesia.

Post war
HMS Trident survived the war, and was sold for scrap on 17 February 1946, and was broken up by Cashmore, of Newport.

References

Publications

External links

 

British T-class submarines of the Royal Navy
Ships built on the River Mersey
1938 ships
World War II submarines of the United Kingdom